Franc Smolej (15 October 1908 – 1996) was a Slovenian cross-country skier. He competed for Yugoslavia in three events at the 1936 and 1948 Winter Olympics with the best result of 10–15th place in the 50 km event.

References

1908 births
1996 deaths
Cross-country skiers at the 1936 Winter Olympics
Cross-country skiers at the 1948 Winter Olympics
Olympic cross-country skiers of Yugoslavia
Slovenian male cross-country skiers